Manica is a genus of ants within the subfamily Myrmicinae. To date it contains seven known species.

Species

M. bradley Wheeler, 1909
M. hunteri Wheeler, 1914
M. invidia Bolton, 1995
M. parasitica Creighton, 1934
M. rubida Latreille, 1802
M. yessensis Azuma, 1973
†M. andrannae Zharkov et Duboviloff, 2023

References

External links

Myrmicinae
Ant genera